The Bruise Brothers was a professional wrestling tag team, composed of Porkchop Cash and Dream Machine, and later Mad Dog Boyd.

History
In 1982, Porkchop Cash joined Jerry Jarrett's Continental Wrestling Association based in Memphis, Tennessee. Cash soon formed a tag team with Troy Graham (who wrestled as "Dream Machine") known as The Bruise Brothers. Wrestling as heels, they held the AWA Southern Tag Team Championship twice. The Bruise Brothers were in the First Family stable of Jimmy Hart. Their main rivals were The Sheepherders, as tag team from New Zealand. They beat Dutch Mantel and Koko B. Ware for their first title on October 3, 1983. They also had a series matches with The Rock 'n' Roll Express, trading the AWA Southern Tag Team Championship with them. A notable moment in the feud came after their match on November 7, 1983. Cash and Graham lost the match and the belts and responded by attacking the referee, Paul Morton (father of Ricky Morton of The Rock 'n' Roll Express). The Bruise Brothers avenged their loss one week later by regaining the championship. On November 29, 1983, The Bruise Brothers dropped the belts to The Fabulous Ones. Tension built within Hart's stable, and The Bruise Brothers faced stablemates The Grapplers (Len Denton and Tony Anthony) in a "losers no longer managed by Jimmy Hart" match on December 26. The Grapplers won, leaving Cash and Graham without a manager.

Shortly thereafter, Cash replaced Graham with Mad Dog Boyd. Cash and Boyd initiated a feud with Eddie Gilbert by stealing a portrait of Gilbert that he had been showing off every week and offering to award to the winner of a draw.

Championships and accomplishments
Continental Wrestling Association
AWA Southern Tag Team Championship (2 times)

References 

Independent promotions teams and stables